Gianmario Mario Baroni (21 January 1910 – 7 February 1952) was an Italian ice hockey player. He competed in the men's tournament at the 1936 Winter Olympics.

References

1910 births
1950 deaths
Ice hockey players at the 1936 Winter Olympics
Ice hockey people from Milan
Olympic ice hockey players of Italy